Shinji Kagawa ( Kagawa Shinji ; born 17 March 1989) is a Japanese professional footballer who plays as a midfielder for J1 League club Cerezo Osaka. He is widely regarded as one of the best Japanese players of all time.

Kagawa began his professional career in his homeland with Cerezo Osaka before joining Borussia Dortmund in 2010. After two years with Dortmund, Kagawa signed for Manchester United on a four-year contract. Two years later, he returned to Dortmund. Kagawa holds the records for most appearances and goals by a Japanese player in UEFA club competitions.

Since making his senior international debut in May 2008, he has won over 90 caps and scored over 30 goals. On 29 November 2012, Kagawa was named Asian Football Confederation International Player of the Year.

Club career
Kagawa was born in Kobe, Hyōgo Prefecture. He started playing football at the age of five. He joined Marino Football Club from 1994 to 1999, Kobe NK Football Club from 1999 to 2001, and FC Miyagi Barcelona in Sendai from 2001 to 2005.

Cerezo Osaka
Cerezo Osaka noticed his talent and signed him at the age of 17. He was the first player in Japan to sign a professional contract before graduating from high school, except players promoted from youth teams of the J.League clubs. In 2007, he gained a regular position but the club missed promotion to the J.League Division 1. It was in 2009 that he became the top scorer of J.League Division 2 and drew widespread attention.

Borussia Dortmund

2010–11 season

In the summer of 2010, Kagawa transferred from Cerezo to Borussia Dortmund for €350,000. The relatively modest cost of the transfer was because of a release clause in Kagawa's contract with Cerezo, which allowed him to leave the club cheaply if he had an opportunity to play in Europe.

On 23 August 2010, he made his debut appearance in the Bundesliga, starting for his new club Dortmund. After scoring his first two competitive goals for the club in the UEFA Europa League qualifying tie against Qarabağ FK, he continued this form with his first goal in the Bundesliga match against VfL Wolfsburg, which Dortmund won 2–0. In the Revierderby against arch-rivals Schalke 04, which Dortmund won 3–1, Kagawa claimed pre-match that he would score two goals; he accomplished the feat, making him a fan favourite in the process.

Kagawa missed half of the Bundesliga season because of an injury he picked up on international duty with Japan, but managed to score eight goals in 18 appearances. His strong effort in the first half of the season helped his side finish as champions of the Bundesliga, and he was even named in the Bundesliga Best XI.

2011–12 season
Kagawa was back in time for the start of the 2011–12 Bundesliga campaign and quickly found his way back into the starting line-up. Kagawa scored his first goal of the new Bundesliga season on 18 September, coming on in a disappointing 2–1 loss to Hannover 96, as Dortmund gave up two goals in the last three minutes. On 22 October, Kagawa opened the scoring in the seventh minute as Dortmund crushed 1. FC Köln 5–0 in front of 80,200 home fans at the Signal Iduna Park. Kagawa scored again on 5 November, as Dortmund brushed aside VfL Wolfsburg 5–1 and moved within two points of league leaders Bayern Munich. Kagawa scored a late consolation against Arsenal in a 2–1 loss in the group stage of the Champions League.

On 28 January 2012, Kagawa scored twice in Dortmund's 3–1 win against Hoffenheim. Kagawa scored the only goal of the game against Werder Bremen on 17 March, heading in a pass from İlkay Gündoğan in the eighth minute. Kagawa scored two goals in Dortmund's 6–1 thrashing of Cologne on 25 March, keeping Dortmund five points ahead of Bayern in the title race. Kagawa won the Bundesliga with Borussia Dortmund in 2012 as they set a Bundesliga record scoring the most points in a season in the Bundesliga, with 81. Kagawa also scored a goal and provided an assist for Dortmund against rivals Bayern Munich in the 2012 DFB-Pokal Final. He scored a total of 13 goals and had 8 assists during that season.

Manchester United

On 5 June 2012, Manchester United announced that they had reached an agreement with Borussia Dortmund and Kagawa for his transfer, a deal that made him the first Japanese player to join the club. The fee was reported to be an initial £12 million, with a further £5 million in possible add-ons. The transfer was completed on 22 June after Kagawa passed his medical at Manchester United and received his UK work permit. On 3 July, it was revealed that Kagawa would wear the number 26 shirt for United. Kagawa spoke about his former club, Borussia Dortmund, saying, "I will carry this club, their great fans, and the whole city in my heart forever and will follow their results with great interest."

On 18 July 2012, Kagawa was handed a two-minute appearance to mark his Manchester United debut in Durban, South Africa, against AmaZulu in a pre-season friendly match. Kagawa made his first start for the Red Devils against Ajax Cape Town on 21 July 2012, and scored his first goal against Shanghai Shenhua four days later. He made his Premier League debut on 20 August 2012, playing the full 90 minutes of United's 1–0 defeat away to Everton. He scored his first goal against Fulham on 25 August in his home debut for the club. After Tom Cleverley's shot was parried by Fulham goalkeeper Mark Schwarzer, Kagawa scored on the rebound from close range. On 19 September, Kagawa was given his first Champions League start as United played against Galatasaray. He provided an assist for the winning goal scored by Michael Carrick in a 1–0 win. On 23 October, he set up Javier Hernández for United's first goal in an eventual 3–2 Champions League victory against Braga. In that match, however, he twisted his knee, which left him sidelined for two months. Kagawa returned from injury in January 2013.

On 2 March 2013, Kagawa scored his first hat-trick for United and also became the first Asian player to score a hat-trick in the Premier League, in his team's 4–0 home win against Norwich City. On 22 April, Kagawa played a part in the title-winning match against Aston Villa in which United won 3–0; he became the first Japanese player to win a Premier League title. On 12 May, Kagawa was included in the United squad to play against Swansea City in Alex Ferguson's last home game before retirement, which United won 2–1. On the same day, Kagawa received his Premier League medal and was voted Man of the Match.

Return to Dortmund
On 31 August 2014, Kagawa officially returned to his former club, Borussia Dortmund, for an undisclosed fee thought to be around £6.5 million and signing a contract until 30 June 2018. He was assigned the shirt number 7 which was vacated by Jonas Hofmann who had left Dortmund to 1. FSV Mainz 05 on loan. On his return debut, Kagawa scored a goal and set up another to help Dortmund win 3–1 against SC Freiburg.

On 14 July 2017, Kagawa extended his contract with Dortmund until 2020.

In the first half of the 2018–19 season, a combination of injury and coach Lucien Favre's preference to play Marco Reus as a central attacking midfielder meant Kagawa played just four times for Dortmund. That led to Kagawa joining Turkish club Beşiktaş on loan for the remainder of the season.

Real Zaragoza
On 9 August 2019, Kagawa completed a transfer to Real Zaragoza of Spain's Segunda División, penning a two-year contract. He debuted for the club on 17 August 2019, in the 2019–20 Segunda División opening match against Tenerife at La Romareda, which Zaragoza won 2–0. Eight days later, he scored his first goal in a 1–1 draw against Ponferradina.

On 2 October 2020, Kagawa's contract was terminated by Zaragoza.

PAOK
On 27 January 2021, Kagawa joined Super League Greece club PAOK on a one-and-a-half-year contract. On 18 December 2021, due to not being part of Răzvan Lucescu's plans, despite some opportunities at the start of the 2021–22 season, Kagawa mutually terminated his contract with the club and for no recompense for the remaining six months. Kagawa left PAOK almost after a year, having only 12 appearances in competitive games, of which only three were as a starter.

Sint-Truiden
On 10 January 2022, Kagawa signed with Belgian club Sint-Truiden.

Return to Cerezo Osaka
On 31 January 2023, Kagawa returned to Japan, joining his boyhood club Cerezo Osaka on a free transfer. On 12 March, in his starting debut for the club in 14 years, he scored his first goal in a 2–1 win against Sagan Tosu, securing the club's first win of the season.

International career
Kagawa played as a member of the Japan under-20 national team in the 2007 FIFA U-20 World Cup held in Canada.

In 2008, he was also selected to play as a member of the Japan team for the 2008 Summer Olympics.

On 24 May 2008, he made his senior international debut in a friendly Kirin Cup match. Japan won the match against Ivory Coast 1–0. However, was not selected in Takeshi Okada's final 23-man squad for the 2010 FIFA World Cup in South Africa. In September 2010, he scored the only goal of the game in Japan's win over Paraguay in Yokohama.

Kagawa was included in the 2011 AFC Asian Cup by coach Alberto Zaccheroni. In the quarter-final against Qatar, he scored two goals. The game ended in 3–2 win for Japan. In the semi-final against South Korea, Kagawa broke his metatarsal bone and missed the final where Japan beat Australia after extra-time.

Kagawa was named in Japan's 23-man squad for the 2013 FIFA Confederations Cup and scored the second goal for his country during the group stage match against Italy, which ended in a 4–3 loss. He was selected for his first World Cup in 2014, but made little impact as the "Samurai Blue" was eliminated at the group stage.

At the 2015 AFC Asian Cup, Kagawa scored Japan's second goal during a 2–0 defeat of Jordan in the group stage and was named as man of the match.

Kagawa participated in Japan's quarter-final match against the United Arab Emirates. After the match ended 1–1 after extra time, Kagawa, who was Japan's final kicker in the penalty shoot-out, hit the post with his kick, as Japan ended up losing the shoot-out 5–4.

Style of play
A technically and creatively gifted player, Kagawa is a versatile attacking midfielder who primarily plays in a playmaking role. He can additionally play on either the left or right flank. Kagawa has good composure on the ball and disciplined decision making and passing. He is an agile player who tends to roam around the opponents' defense looking for an intelligent and creative pass or through ball. He has great attacking play both on and off the ball. He also has great attacking positioning which allows him to have one of the best eyes for goal. Perhaps his best qualities are his agility, passing discipline, creativity, positioning during attack and the ability to pick out a key pass. He's fairly quick and can attack and score goals himself. Whilst playing for Japan, he has played in a left midfield, or a central attacking midfield role.

Career statistics

Club

International

Scores and results list Japan's goal tally first, score column indicates score after each Kagawa goal.

Honours
Borussia Dortmund
Bundesliga: 2010–11, 2011–12
DFB-Pokal: 2011–12, 2016–17

Manchester United
Premier League: 2012–13
FA Community Shield: 2013

Japan
AFC Asian Cup: 2011

Individual
Bundesliga Player of the Hinrunde: 2010
kicker Bundesliga Team of the Season: 2010–11, 2011–12
kicker Bundesliga first half of the 2012 season, only one selected for world class.
VDV Team of the Season: 2011–12
ESM Team of the Season: 2011–12
AFC Asian International Player of the Year: 2012
Bundesliga Team of the Season: 2015–16
IFFHS Asian Men's Team of All Time: 2021

Notes

References

External links

 
 
 
 
 
 
 

1989 births
Living people
Sportspeople from Kobe
Association football people from Hyōgo Prefecture
Japanese footballers
Japan youth international footballers
Japan international footballers
Association football midfielders
J1 League players
J2 League players
Bundesliga players
Regionalliga players
Premier League players
Süper Lig players
Segunda División players
Super League Greece players
Cerezo Osaka players
Borussia Dortmund players
Borussia Dortmund II players
Manchester United F.C. players
Beşiktaş J.K. footballers
Real Zaragoza players
PAOK FC players
Sint-Truidense V.V. players
Olympic footballers of Japan
Footballers at the 2008 Summer Olympics
2011 AFC Asian Cup players
AFC Asian Cup-winning players
2013 FIFA Confederations Cup players
2014 FIFA World Cup players
2015 AFC Asian Cup players
2018 FIFA World Cup players
Japanese expatriate footballers
Expatriate footballers in Germany
Expatriate footballers in England
Expatriate footballers in Turkey
Expatriate footballers in Spain
Expatriate footballers in Greece
Expatriate footballers in Belgium
Japanese expatriate sportspeople in Germany
Japanese expatriate sportspeople in England
Japanese expatriate sportspeople in Turkey
Japanese expatriate sportspeople in Spain
Japanese expatriate sportspeople in Greece
Japanese expatriate sportspeople in Belgium